The 1995 European Amateur Team Championship took place 5–9 July at Royal Antwerp Golf Club in Kapellen, Belgium, 20 kilometres north of the city center of Antwerp. It was the 19th men's golf European Amateur Team Championship.

Format 
Each team consisted of six players, playing two rounds of opening stroke-play qualifying competition over two days, counting the five best scores each day for each team.

The eight best teams formed flight A, in knock-out match-play over the next three days. The teams were seeded based on their positions after the stroke play. The first placed team were drawn to play the quarter final against the eight placed team, the second against the seventh, the third against the sixth and the fourth against the fifth. Teams were allowed to use six players during the team matches, selecting four of them in the two morning foursome games and five players in to the afternoon single games. Games all square at the 18th hole were declared halved, if the team match was already decided.

The eight teams placed 9–16 in the qualification stroke-play formed flight B and the four teams placed 16–20 formed flight C, to play similar knock-out play, with one foursome game and four single games, to decide their final positions.

Teams 
20 nation teams contested the event. Each team consisted of six players.

Players in the leading teams

Other participating teams

Winners 
Team Scotland won the opening 36-hole qualifying competition, with a 32-under-par score of 688, six strokes ahead of Sweden.

There was no official award for the lowest individual scores, but individual leaders were  Pádraig Harrington, Ireland and Gordon Sherry, Scotland, each with a 9-under-par score of 135, one stroke ahead of nearest competitors.

Team Scotland won the gold medal, earning their fourth title, beating defending champions team England in the final 6–1.

Team Sweden earned the bronze on third place, after beating France 4.5–2.5 in the bronze match.

Results 
Qualification round

Team standings

* Note: In the event of a tie the order was determined by the best total of the two non-counting scores of the two rounds.

Individual leaders

 Note: There was no official award for the lowest individual score.

Flight A

Bracket

Final games

* Note: Game declared halved, since team match already decided.

Flight B

First round elimination matches

Second round elimination matches

Match for 15th place

Match for 13th place

Match for 11th place

Match for 9th place

Flight C

Final standings

Sources:

See also 
 Eisenhower Trophy – biennial world amateur team golf championship for men organized by the International Golf Federation.
 European Ladies' Team Championship – European amateur team golf championship for women organised by the European Golf Association.

References

External links 
 European Golf Association: Full results

European Amateur Team Championship
Golf tournaments in Belgium
European Amateur Team Championship
European Amateur Team Championship
European Amateur Team Championship